Albert Peter Kawal (July 4, 1912 – January 1, 1990) was an American football and basketball player and coach of football, basketball, and baseball.  He served as the head football coach at Drake University (1947–1948), Temple University (1949–1954), and Southern Illinois University Carbondale (1960–1961), compiling a career college football record of 52–53–6.  Kawal was also the head baseball coach at the University of Tulsa in 1964, tallying a mark of 10–12.  He played football and basketball at Northwestern University

Coaching career

Drake
Kawal got his first head coaching job as the 16th head football coach at Drake University in Des Moines, Iowa and he held that position for two seasons, from 1947 until 1948.  His record at Drake was 8–10–1.

Temple
Kawal  he was the 15th head football coach at Temple University in Philadelphia and he held that position for six seasons, from 1949 until 1954.  His  record at Temple was 24–28–3.

Southern Illinois
Kawal was the eighth head football coach at Southern Illinois University Carbondale and served there four seasons, from 1955 until 1958.  His record at Southern Illinois was 20–15–2.

Head coaching record

Football

Personal life 
Albert Peter "Al" Kawal was born July 4, 1912, in Cicero, Illinois, to Peter and Martha (Yuknis) Kawal. On April 28, 1936, in Boston, Massachusetts, he married Almyra P Wilcox (died August 26, 1951). On January 1, 1937, their daughter, Martha Allison Kawal (died September 9, 2011), was born in Boston. In 1952 he married Mary Louise Clifford (died July 30, 1999). He and Mary retired to Florida in the early 1970s. Kawal died on January 1, 1990, in Safety Harbor, Florida.

References

External links
 

1912 births
1990 deaths
American football guards
American men's basketball players
Guards (basketball)
Boston University Terriers football coaches
Drake Bulldogs football coaches
Lafayette Leopards football coaches
Michigan State Spartans football coaches
Michigan State Spartans men's basketball coaches
Northwestern Wildcats football players
Northwestern Wildcats men's basketball players
Southern Illinois Salukis football coaches
Temple Owls football coaches
Tulane Green Wave football coaches
Tulsa Golden Hurricane baseball coaches
Tulsa Golden Hurricane football coaches
United States Navy personnel of World War II
United States Navy officers
People from Cicero, Illinois
Military personnel from Illinois